A. K. A. Firoze Noon (4 January 1946 – 23 December 2006) was a Bangladeshi politician who was one of the founding members of Bangladesh Nationalist Party (BNP). He was the founder principal of BNP's political training center. Former political and economic research secretary of BNP, he served as the political adviser of the then Prime Minister of Bangladesh Khaleda Zia during 1991–1996. He was also the VP of East Pakistan Student League (1966-1967).

Early life
Noon was born in Samspur, Sreenagar in the then Bengal Presidency on 4 January 1946. His father Mozammel Hossain, popularly known as Suba Miah was for sometimes President of the Kolapara Union of Bikrampur. His mother Sufula Begum (Chappa) was the granddaughter of Khan Bahadur Khabirullah.

Noon studied in Shomspur School and St. Joseph High School, Khulna. He completed his matriculation in 1963 from Model High School in Khulna. He graduated from B L College of Khulna in arts in 1967.

Political career

Student politics

Around this time in the college the entire East Pakistan was seized by controversy over the Hamoodur Rahman Education Commission Report. The Student Community as a whole rose in protest and demanded to scrap of the report which would have gone against the interest of the students if implemented. Noon was the Convenor of the Committee of the college students and was eventually involved in its leadership. This was the time he joined the Students’ League (Chatro League). Being in the front ranking leader of the students he earned the wrath of the government of East Pakistan and was put behind the bars for some time in 1963.

Noon participated in the movements of the students of East Pakistan including the 6-point program of Awami League and 11-point program of the students – the main opposition political party students movement respectively at that time.

Experiences in various capacity 
Noon was associated with the following cabinets, organizations, associations and other committees in different capacities

Distinguished Member, Envoy's Pool of the Minister of Foreign Affairs (Bangladesh) (1978-1980)
Principal, BNP Political Training Center for Cabinet Ministers, MPs and other political activists (1977-1980)
Political and Economic Research Secretary of BNP
Political Adviser of Prime Minister of Bangladesh Begum Khaleda Zia (1991-1996)
Director in the Board of Directors, Shilpa Bank (1991-1996)
Chairman, Selection committee for Sick Industries under the Ministry of Industry (Bangladesh) (1991-1996)
Member, Reform Committee for Education and Prevention of Corruption of the Ministry of Education (Bangladesh) (1991-1996)
Managing Director, Cooperative Jute Mills Ltd (1991-1996)
Director, Cooperative Bank and Cooperative Jute Society (1991-1996)
Member, Film Censor Board, Film Jury Board for 9 years from 1978
Member, Steering Committee, Bangladesh Open University (1991-1996)
Senate Member, Bangladesh National University (1991–1996)
Director in the Board of Directors, Shilpakala Academy (National Academy of Fine and Performing Arts)
Founder Member, Viqarunnesa Noon School & College Governing Committee
Convenor, Finance Committee Viqarunnesa Noon School & College
Honorary Treasure, Viqarunnesa Noon School & College
Founder Convenor, Viqarunnesa School and College Dhanmondi Branch in 1993
Founder, Shomspur Business Management College
Chairman, Shomspur High School
Chairman, Noon Interactive
General Manager, Dainik Desh Newspaper
President, Bangladesh Roller Skating Federation
President, Bangladesh Boxing Federation
Adviser, Olympic Industries Limited
Adviser, Bombay Sweets & Co. Ltd
Adviser, eSophers Ltd

Publications
Noon was the author of five books on the life and works of President Ziaur Rahman. Publications include:

Amar Rajniteer Ruprekha (1986)
Zia Keno Jonopriyoo (1991)
Chotoder Jonno Ziaur Rahman (1991)
Chotoder Komol Janatar Zia (2002)
Shahid Zia er Shrishto Boktrita (2002)

Involvement in journalism and cultural sector

Noon was associated with The Daily Ittefaq as a reporter in 1963-1964 and with Dainik Desh as its general manager from 1982 to 1990. Besides, he has been a regular contributor to the post-editorial column of many dailies of Bangladesh.

Among his other accomplishments, Noon was a television personality being a noted Compare and Conductor of talk show on Bangladesh Television (BTV). Besides, he presided over the National Debating Competition on BTV. He was a regular guest speaker of Tritio Matra on Channel i and also regular on NTV, ATN Bangla, RTV etc. as guest speaker.

Noon received Atish Diponkar Gold Medal Award for the merit of performance and contribution in the socio-cultural arena.

References 

1946 births
2006 deaths
People from Bikrampur
Bangladesh Nationalist Party politicians
Krishak Sramik Party politicians
Bangladeshi male writers